Mohammad Amin (born 2 May 1987) is a Pakistani-born cricketer who plays for the Kuwait national cricket team. He played in the 2013 ICC World Cricket League Division Six tournament. He made his Twenty20 International (T20I) debut for Kuwait against the Maldives on 20 January 2019 in the 2019 ACC Western Region T20 tournament.

References

External links
 

1987 births
Living people
Kuwaiti cricketers
Kuwait Twenty20 International cricketers
Pakistani emigrants to Kuwait
Pakistani expatriates in Kuwait
Cricketers from Gujranwala